Joseph Gerald Webster is a Democratic member of the Pennsylvania House of Representatives, representing the 150th District.

Education and Military career
Webster graduated from La Salle College High School in 1976. He then graduated from the United States Air Force Academy in 1980 with a degree in Engineering and Humanities. Webster would later receive Master of Arts degrees from Wright State in English in 1984 and Naval War College in National Security Policy Studies in 2001 and a PhD from George Washington University in Public Policy in 2004. He went on to serve as an officer in the United States Air Force for 31 years, including 20 years at the Pentagon working on special projects and eventually serving as the legislative liaison between the Air Force and Congress, eventually retiring at the rank of Colonel.

Political career
In 2018 Webster ran to replace retiring Republican Michael Corr. He won the general election with 56% of the vote, beating Republican Nick Fountain.

Webster currently sits on the Appropriations, Finance, State Government, and Veterans Affairs & Emergency Preparedness committees.

References

External links
PA House website
Official Party website

Year of birth missing (living people)
Living people
People from Montgomery County, Pennsylvania
United States Air Force Academy alumni
Wright State University alumni
Naval War College alumni
George Washington University alumni
United States Air Force colonels
Democratic Party members of the Pennsylvania House of Representatives
21st-century American politicians